Asgarby is a hamlet in the civil parish of Asgarby and Howell, in the North Kesteven district of Lincolnshire, England.

Asgarby Grade I listed Anglican church is dedicated to St Andrew. The church has a crocketed spire and buttresses, a  Decorated nave, and an Early English priests' doorway.

References

External links

 

Hamlets in Lincolnshire
North Kesteven District